Donald Franklin Klein (September 4, 1928 – August 7, 2019) was an American psychiatrist known for his work on anxiety disorders.

From 1976 until his emeritate in 2006, he was professor of psychiatry at Columbia University in New York and medical director of the New York State Psychiatric Institute.

He is well known for his approach to psychopharmacological dissection, which, he argued, allowed one to 'pierce through the fascinating, confusing web of symptoms and dysfunctions to tease out the major participant variables by attending to specific drug effects'.

References

External links
Klein's page at Columbia

1928 births
2019 deaths
American psychiatrists
Physicians from New York City
Colby College alumni
Columbia University faculty
New York University alumni
People from the Bronx
SUNY Downstate College of Medicine alumni